American rock band Evanescence has released five studio albums, two live albums, one compilation album, two demo albums, three extended plays, eighteen singles, nine promotional singles, two video albums, and eighteen music videos. Evanescence was formed in Little Rock, Arkansas in 1995 by Amy Lee and Ben Moody. After several changes over the years, the band's lineup comprises Lee, guitarist Tim McCord, guitarist Troy McLawhorn, drummer Will Hunt, and bassist Emma Anzai. As of 2014, the band has sold over 25 million albums worldwide.

Evanescence's early recordings as a duo were released in the late 1990s through independent label Bigwig Enterprises, beginning with their self-titled EP in 1998, followed by the Sound Asleep EP the following year, which they sold at their live shows. The band recorded and released a demo album in 2000, titled Origin. 2,500 copies of Origin were pressed, and went on sale for high prices online soon after the release of their debut studio album. The band signed to Wind-up Records in January 2001. In early 2003, they released the Mystary EP.

Evanescence's debut studio album, Fallen, was released in March 2003. It spawned the singles "Bring Me to Life", "Going Under", "My Immortal", and "Everybody's Fool". "Bring Me to Life" and "My Immortal" peaked in the top ten in multiple countries, and respectively were certified triple platinum and platinum by the RIAA. In the US, Fallen sold 141,000 copies in its first week, and peaked at number three on the Billboard 200. It has sold over 17 million units worldwide, and was certified diamond by the RIAA in 2022 for selling 10 million units in the US. The success of the album and its singles garnered Evanescence two Grammy Awards (for Best New Artist and Best Hard Rock Performance). While touring Fallen, the band recorded their live show in Paris, which was released on the live album and concert DVD Anywhere but Home (2004). The record was certified gold in the US, and sold over one million units worldwide.

Their second album, The Open Door, was released in 2006 and debuted at number one on four national charts, including the Billboard 200, selling over 447,000 copies in its first week in the United States. The Open Door spawned four singles. The lead single, "Call Me When You're Sober", attained chart success similar to "Bring Me to Life" and "My Immortal", and was certified platinum by the RIAA. "Call Me When You're Sober" was followed by the singles "Lithium", "Sweet Sacrifice", and "Good Enough". "Sweet Sacrifice" earned a nomination at the 50th Grammy Awards in 2008 for Best Hard Rock Performance.  The Open Door has sold over five million units worldwide. It has sold 2.1 million units in the United States, and has been certified double platinum by the RIAA.

Evanescence, their third studio album, was released in 2011. It debuted at number one on the Billboard 200, where its US sales had reached 127,000 copies in its first week. It also peaked in the top five in ten other countries. The first single, "What You Want", was released in August, attaining moderate chart success. The second single, "My Heart Is Broken", was released in October. The last single from the album, "Lost in Paradise", was released in May 2012, and "The Other Side" followed as a promotional single the following month. By August 2012, Evanescence had sold over 421,000 copies in the United States. In December 2020, the album was certified gold by the RIAA for earning over 500,000 units in the country.

Albums

Studio albums

Live albums

Compilation albums

Demo albums

Box sets

Extended plays

Singles

Promotional singles

Other charting songs

Videos

Video albums

Music videos

Notes

References

External links
 
 
 

Discographies of American artists
Discography
Heavy metal group discographies